Jason Gregory Evigan (born June 10, 1983) is an American musician, singer, songwriter, and record producer.

His songwriting credits include co-writing and production of Maroon 5's "Girls Like You" and "What Lovers Do", Madonna's "Ghosttown", Demi Lovato's "Heart Attack", the Jason Derulo and 2 Chainz featured three-time platinum "Talk Dirty", David Guetta's "Lovers on the Sun", and Robin Schulz's "Shed a Light".

Evigan was the vocalist for the rock band After Midnight Project, although the band is on hiatus as of October 2, 2014. Jason and Victoria Evigan began their artist project Elephant Heart, known for songs "Hiya" and "Warfare" released in June 2018.

Early life
Evigan was born in Los Angeles, California, to actor Greg Evigan and Broadway dancer Pamela C. Serpe. He is the brother of actresses Briana Evigan and Vanessa Lee Evigan.

Career
He has worked with numerous recording artists including Maroon 5, Kelly Clarkson, Demi Lovato, Avicii, Madonna, Nick Jonas, Kiiara, Zedd, Rufus Du Sol, Bebe Rexha, Skylar Grey, Jon Bellion, Starrah, Troye Sivan, Julia Michaels and Britney Spears. He has also produced records with Selena Gomez, Fifth Harmony, Zendaya, and Lupe Fiasco.

Prior to his career as a writer and producer, Evigan was the lead singer of the Los Angeles-based band After Midnight Project. The band released one album and four EPs. They participated in the Warped Tour and played with artists including Chevelle, Red Jumpsuit Apparatus, Papa Roach, Thirty Seconds to Mars, 10 Years, and Story of the Year.

Evigan is a member of the production duo "The Suspex" with fellow writer and producer Mitch Allan. The pair have penned numerous hits including Demi Lovato's "Heart Attack". Evigan credits his entry into pop songwriting to Disney A&R executive Mio Vukovic after Vukovic introduced him to Demi Lovato.  Evigan went on to have four songs on Demi and two on Selena Gomez's debut album Stars Dance. In 2020, Evigan signed the deal with Sony/ATV Music Publishing.

Discography

Songwriting and production credits

Singles
 2013: Demi Lovato – "Heart Attack"
 2013: Demi Lovato – "Made in the USA" 
 2013: Jason Derulo – "Talk Dirty" 
 2014: David Guetta – "Lovers On The Sun"
 2015: Kelly Clarkson – "Heartbeat Song"
 2015: Madonna – "Ghosttown"
 2016: Robin Schulz (featuring David Guetta, Cheat Codes) – "Shed a Light"
 2017: Papa Roach – "Born For Greatness"
 2017: Boy Epic – "Kanye's In My Head"
 2017: Maroon 5 (featuring SZA) – "What Lovers Do"
 2017: Chromeo - "Juice"
 2017: Sofia Carson - "Ins And Outs"
 2017: Boy Epic - "Trust"
 2017: Sage The Gemini - "Whatchacha"
 2018: Maroon 5 (featuring Cardi B) – "Girls Like You"
 2018: Rüfüs Du Sol - "No Place"
 2018: Rüfüs Du Sol - "Underwater"
 2018: Rüfüs Du Sol - "Lost in My Mind"
 2018: Rüfüs Du Sol - "Treat You Better"
 2018: Elephant Heart - "Hiya"
 2018: Elephant Heart - "Warfare"
 2019: Clean Bandit (featuring Ellie Goulding) - "Mama"
 2019: Madonna  - "I Rise"
 2019: Madonna  - "Crazy"
 2019: Hobo Johnson  - "Typical Story"
 2019: Hobo Johnson  - "Ugly Kid"
 2019: Ellie Goulding (featuring Juice Wrld)  - "Hate Me"
 2019: Illenium (featuring Jon Bellion)  - "Good Things Fall Apart"
 2020: Dan + Shay - "I Should Probably Go to Bed"

Filmography

See also

 List of people from Los Angeles

References

External links

1983 births
Living people
20th-century American singers
20th-century American writers
20th-century American composers
21st-century American singers
21st-century American writers
21st-century American composers
American male pop singers
American male songwriters
American multi-instrumentalists
Record producers from California
American rock singers
Singers from Los Angeles
Songwriters from California
Writers from Los Angeles
20th-century American male writers
20th-century American male singers
21st-century American male singers